Hypersthenuria is a condition where the osmolality of the urine is increased.

Hyposthenuria (sg is lower than 1.007)

Isosthenuria (sg is 1.010)

Hypersthenuria (sg is greater than 1.025)

See also
 Hyposthenuria
 Isosthenuria

<ref>Francis, Y. F., & Worthen, H. G. (1968). Hyposthenuria in sickle cell disease. Journal of the National Medical Association, 60(4), 266–270.</ref

Abnormal clinical and laboratory findings for urine